The men's pole vault at the 2012 IAAF World Indoor Championships took place on 10 March at the Ataköy Athletics Arena.

Medalists

Records

Qualification standards

Schedule

Results

Final

10 athletes from 7 countries participated.  The final started at 17:00 and ended at 18:58.

References

Pole Vault
Pole vault at the World Athletics Indoor Championships